Bauduc may refer to:

Felice Cerruti Bauduc, Italian painter
Ray Bauduc, drummer 
Château Bauduc estate, near Bordeaux